Zamb (ザム) is a Japanese musical group produced by Daiko Nagato. On 10 June, the band debuted with the single Love Satisfaction. The name of the band comes from initial alphabets Zamb - "Zuga Anisong Metal Band" (図画アニソンメタルバンド). Before major debut, they've used the longer name of the band.

History
The band formation has started in the late 2018 by introducing four members, including two original and two as support members (which was Kurumatani Keisuke from Sensation and Ryuu Kida from Garl), who appeared as a new forming band "Zuga Anisong Metal Band" in the free live event Onto.

In July 2019, they would post on official YouTube channel cover songs of famous anime theme songs with the metal arrangement, including Zankoku na Tenshi no Thesis or Moonlight Densetsu. Gak's heavy metal influence comes from his deceased father, Hiroaki Matsuzawa (former member of heavy-metal band, Make-Up) who was also musician and wrote song for the anime televisions series Saint Seya.

In August 2019, the band has launched official Twitter account and in March 2020 official launched website.

In October 2019, they've appeared on the free music festival "Onto" where they performed only original theme songs.

On 12 June 2020, the band will debut on Sacra Music music label under Sony Music Entertainment Japan with the debut single Love Satisfaction, which was used as an ending theme to the anime television series Dropkick on My Devil!. Their contract under the label expired at the end of the year.

Members
  - vocals
 GAK - Guitar, Scream

Discography

Singles

References

External links
ZAMB official Web site 
Zamb Official YouTube channel 
 	

Being Inc. artists
Japanese rock music groups
Anime musical groups
Musical groups established in 2018
2018 establishments in Japan